Kathryn Abbey Hanna Park is a  public beach and city park in Jacksonville, Florida. It is located at Mayport in the Jacksonville Beaches area.

History
Part of what is now Hanna Park was formerly Manhattan Beach, Florida's first beach community for African Americans during the period of segregation in the United States.  around 1900s by blacks working on the Florida East Coast Railway. At its height the beach included amenities such as picnic pavilions, cottages, and an amusement park. It flourished until around 1940, when it was superseded as a day-trip destination by the larger American Beach in nearby Amelia Island.

In 1967,  of land for the park was donated by Winthrop Bancroft, who required that the land be named for Kathryn Abbey Hanna (November 8, 1895 – 1967), a Chicago-born educator and author who had settled in Florida and served on the Board of Parks and Historic Memorials.

Following the Jacksonville Consolidation, the area became part of Jacksonville. The city purchased the surrounding property in the 1970s during the administration of Mayor Hans Tanzler, expanding the park. The first general purpose trail was constructed by Michael Long in 1987 as his Eagle Scout service project. Most of the land has been left in its natural, wooded state. Boardwalks were constructed over the dunes to protect vegetation.

Features

In addition to the white sand beach on the Atlantic Ocean, the park offers:  

Offroad bike trails
For experienced riders, trails named Grunt, Misery, and Tornado Alley offer a challenging workout. Sanctioned races are held on a seasonal schedule and many local cyclists ride the trails on a daily basis. This trail wins the award for "Most Difficult Close to the Sea" and was rated four out of five stars on the Trails website.

Campground
Almost 300 campsites are nestled in the woods along winding, paved roads for tent camping or RV use, plus there are six small log "cozy cabins", great for the summer.

Dolphin Plaza
The park has a beachfront facility that can be rented by groups, with a view of sand dunes and surf.

Freshwater lake
A former borrow pit for road construction in the park turned into a  freshwater lake which opened in 1978. Activities available include, fishing, kayaking, paddle boating, and canoeing; lakeside picnic tables and grills are available and scenic trails surround the lake. A water playground is provided for small children.

Other amenities
There is a visitor/interpretive center and shuffleboard and volleyball courts.  Throughout the park there are benches, grills, picnic shelters & tables, playground equipment, restrooms and trash barrels.

References

External links
 Kathryn Abbey Hanna Park web page
 Hanna Park campground map
 Hanna Park bike trails map

Culture of Jacksonville, Florida
Geography of Jacksonville, Florida
Parks in Jacksonville, Florida
1967 establishments in Florida
Protected areas established in 1967